10-07: L'affaire Zeus is a 1995 French Canadian TV police drama series. Four 45 minute episodes were produced.

Cast
Gildor Roy as Phil Nadeau
Patrick Labbé as Tom Saint-Mars
Chantal Fontaine as Claudia D'Annunzio
Michel Barrette as Delvecchio
Yves Soutière as Réjean Turcotte
Gilbert Sicotte as Martineau
Marcel Leboeuf as Marcel Lussier
Germain Houde as Jean Beauregard
Bobby Beshro as Bisaillon
Michel Albert as Albert
Claudia Cardinale as Agent
Michel Monty as René Dionne
Heikki Salomaa as Ile
Catherine Sénart as Jeanne Morin
Pierre Chagnon as Karl Bisonnette

References

External links

Noovo original programming
1995 Canadian television series debuts
1995 Canadian television series endings
1990s Canadian crime drama television series
1990s Canadian television miniseries